Coleophora nielseni is a moth of the family Coleophoridae. It is found in southern Queensland, Australia.

Etymology
The species is dedicated to Dr. Ebbe Schmidt Nielsen.

References

Moths of Australia
nielseni
Moths described in 1996